Erdinç Kebapçı (born 27 June 1993) is a Turkish trap shooter. He is a member of Kocaeli BB Kağıt SK

Kebapçı won the gold medal in the men's team trap event at the 2015 Summer Universiade in Gwangju, South Korea.

He earned a quota spot for the 2016 Summer Olympics.

References

1993 births
Sportspeople from Manisa
Turkish male sport shooters
Trap and double trap shooters
Kocaeli Büyükşehir Belediyesi Kağıt Spor athletes
Living people
Shooters at the 2016 Summer Olympics
Olympic shooters of Turkey
Medalists at the 2015 Summer Universiade
Universiade medalists in shooting
Universiade gold medalists for Turkey
21st-century Turkish people